Lap-Ban Chan (1911-1990) was a former Chinese actress from Hong Kong. Chan was credited with over 440 films.

Personal life 
In 1911, Chan was born in Thailand.

Career 
In 1949, Chan became an actress for Nanyang Film Company in Hong Kong. Chan first appeared in Adventure at the Women's House, a 1949 Cantonese opera film directed by Fung Chi-Kong. Chan is known for her support role as a mother, aunt, landlady, or maid. Chan also appeared in roles with titles such as a doctor, pretty woman, teacher, sifu, clan leader, etc. Chan appeared as a doctor in Blood, Rouge and Tears (1950). Chan appeared as a pretty woman in Joyous Reunion (1952). In Martial Arts films, Chan appeared as a sifu in Half a Sword (Part 1) (1963) and a clan leader in Buddha's Palm (1982). Chan's last film was Look Out, Officer!, a 1990 comedy film directed by Lau Shut-Yue. Chan is credited with over 440 films.

Filmography

Films 
This is a partial list of films.
 1949 Adventure at the Women's House - Cantonese opera. 
 1950 Black Market Marriage 
 1950 Wild Flowers Are Sweeters - Ah Choi, maid
 1950 The Kid - Landlady 
 1950 Lust of a Grand Lady - Musical 
 1950 Blood, Rouge and Tears - Doctor 
 1952 Joyous Reunion - Pretty woman
 1955 Backyard Adventures - Fortune-teller's servant. 
 1955 The Faithful Wife 
 1963 Half a Sword (Part 1) - Sifu
 1965 Dim-Sum Queen - Eighth Aunt
 1979 The Wickedness in Poverty - Old Playboy bunny
 1981 Super Fool! - Dragon's mother 
 1981 Bewitched - Old magic woman
 1981 Wedding Bells, Wedding Belles 
 1982 Buddha's Palm - Clan leader
 1983 Hong Kong Playboys 
 1983 The Lost Generation - Auntie Sam	
 1983 Red Panther - Lei's mother	
 1984 Prince Charming - May's grandmother 
 1984 Wits of the Brats - Mary, old maid
 1989 God of Gamblers - Knife's mother 
 1990 Look Out, Officer! - Cleaning lady

Personal life 
On July 18, 1990, Chan died in Hong Kong.

References

External links 
 Lap Ban Chan at imdb.com
 Chan Laap Ban at hkcinemagic.com
 Lap Ban Chan at rottentomatoes.com
 Maria Chan at douban.com (in Chinese)

1911 births
1990 deaths
Hong Kong film actresses
Thai emigrants to Hong Kong